José Tola Pasquel (February 12, 1914 – December 1, 1999) was a Peruvian engineer.

References

1914 births
1999 deaths
National University of San Marcos alumni
Academic staff of the National University of San Marcos
People from Lima
20th-century Peruvian engineers